The 1999 Esiliiga is the ninth season of the Esiliiga, second-highest Estonian league for association football clubs, since its establishment in 1992.

Final table

Promotion playoff
Lelle SK beat FC Lootus Kohtla-Järve. Lelle SK remained in Meistriliiga, Lootus in Esiliiga.

See also
 1999 Meistriliiga

Esiliiga seasons
2
Estonia
Estonia